The David Lee Roth Show was a nationally syndicated American radio show hosted by musician David Lee Roth that aired from January 3 to April 21, 2006. It was the replacement of The Howard Stern Show following its departure from terrestrial to the subscription-based Sirius Satellite Radio. It was simulcast on seven stations owned by CBS Radio, who launched the show as part of its Free FM radio format. Notably different from Howard Stern's program, or corporate "morning zoo" and "shock jock" formats which dominated morning radio at the time, Roth's show sounded similar to pirate radio, featuring ethnic and non-commercial rock music integrated with personal stories, occasionally uncomfortable debates on intellectual matters, and interviews with people Roth admired, such as guitarist Brian May, baseball player Johnny Damon, and Roth's uncle, Manny Roth.

Following its January 2006 debut, a plurality of critics savaged the show, chiding its "amateurishness," while a minority praised Roth's willingness to bring something so obviously "non-corporate" (and ultimately "anti-corporate") to American mainstream radio. Arbitron numbers showed that Roth's radio program initially lost a sizable portion of the Howard Stern audience; however, by the end of his tenure, his show began to find advocates in people disenchanted by Clear Channel-formatted radio. Roth's firing from CBS Radio ended in a lawsuit, which was eventually settled.

History
From March 14 to 18, 2005, Roth auditioned by hosting the morning show on the classic rock station WZLX-FM in Boston, Massachusetts. This was followed by a three-hour stint at KLSX-FM in Los Angeles, California. In July 2005, news reports speculated that David Lee Roth had an agreement with Infinity Broadcasting to replace Stern, with the prospect of launching the show as early as September, as Stern considered the possibility of leaving terrestrial airwaves early. Roth signed a deal with Infinity that was worth an estimated $4 million. Roth was announced as Stern's replacement on October 25, 2005, who appeared on Stern's show as a surprise guest.

The David Lee Roth Show launched on January 3, 2006. The show was produced by CBS Radio as part of its Free FM format, and was based out of WFNY-FM in New York City. The show replaced Howard Stern's show in a majority of the latter show's east coast markets, following Stern's move from the FM dial to Sirius Satellite Radio at the end of 2005. Host David Lee Roth had been an American pop culture icon since the late 1970s, first as the ostentatious original frontman for Van Halen, and later as a solo artist. The David Lee Roth Show aired in seven markets on CBS-owned-and-operated stations, WFNY-FM in New York City, WBCN-FM in Boston, WNCX-FM in Cleveland, KLLI-FM in Dallas, WYSP-FM in Philadelphia, WRKZ-FM in Pittsburgh and WPBZ-FM in West Palm Beach.

On March 7, 2006, WFNY station manager Tom Chiusano and programming vice president Mark Chernoff held a meeting with Roth to discuss ways for Roth to improve the show. According to Roth, the pair asked him to stop playing "foreign" and "ethnic" soundbeds and appeal to "a 35-year-old white male who likes Lynyrd Skynyrd". Roth spent most of the following live broadcast criticising Chiusano and Chernoff and their suggestions, claiming they wanted him to "copy Stern" which he refused to do, and stressed that he was hired to deliver something "unique". Roth was informed that a female newscaster would be added to the show's line-up. There was mass speculation regarding cancellation or format change when Roth took an unexpected one-week vacation in March, after having been doing the show for only two months. Following weeks of mounting tension between Roth and CBS Radio management (which Roth often expressed on-air), and several (corporately ordered) changes in format.

On April 21, 2006, around 20 minutes before the show went live, Roth was told that the show was being cancelled after the day's broadcast. He expressed disappointment as he was enjoying doing radio, but said "someone will pay". After Roth was dropped from the airwaves he sought legal action. The matter was settled out of court.

On April 24, CBS Radio announced that Roth was being replaced by Opie and Anthony, which aired on weekday mornings on Sirius rival XM Satellite Radio, from April 26. This marked the show's return on terrestrial radio since their firing in August 2002 for a stunt which allegedly involved a couple having sex in St. Patrick's Cathedral. The show aired on all of Roth's former affiliates except for Cleveland, which opted for a local morning show and instead, place Opie and Anthony in afternoons. In March 2009, following the introduction of the people meter ratings system and a declining audience, WFNY dropped Opie and Anthony and switched formats.

Criticism
Critics and fans alike generally concluded that Roth was unprepared for a radio show, and close to the demise of the show, Roth himself suggested on the air that he agreed with this assessment. He also stated on-air at least once, in response to a caller's complaint, that he thought the show "sucked", although this was in reference to the new format forced upon him by Free-FM management.

Roth said that during the first four weeks on the air, "I was like a fish flopping around at the end of a stick."

Howard Stern stated that the original incarnation of Van Halen is his favorite rock and roll band of all-time, and also that he "like[s] David Lee Roth" on a personal level. Regarding The David Lee Roth Show, Stern stated in a 2010 interview with former CBS executive Rob Barnett that he knew that the show would fail when Roth did not seem to grasp the idea that talking to a radio audience is different from talking to the crowd at a rock concert. "He looked at me with a blank stare," said Stern, "like he wasn't concerned."

In the April 28 edition of the Boston Herald, reporters Gayle Fee and Laura Raposa wrote that some observers speculated that Roth was never intended to successfully replace Howard Stern. Supposedly, CBS Radio wanted to hire Opie and Anthony but did not because Stern openly disliked Opie and Anthony, was a fan of Roth. Reportedly, management at CBS Radio (then called Infinity Broadcasting) believed that whoever replaced Stern was doomed. An insider at CBS Radio was quoted as saying to the Boston Herald reporters that "(he) looked good to Wall Street, and they gave him a real shot. They would have loved for him to succeed, but he wasn’t a radio guy."

"Roth's show is ... skin-crawlingly awful. ... In these days of bland Clear Channel/Infinity corporate radio, it's bracing to hear a guy who has no idea what he's doing. ... Listening to Roth, you feel actual physical pain." - Rob Sheffield, Rolling Stone

"He's a mess, and he's a loudmouth punk." - syndicated radio host Don Imus, whose show aired opposite Roth's on sister station WFAN.

Show cast
David Lee Roth – Host
John Hutchinson – Board operator (Known as Hutch)
Brian Young – Guitarist (Known as B. Young)

Guests
Robin Bakay – guest co–host
Linda Reisman – guest co–host, Dave's EMT instructor
Lisa Roth – guest co–host, Dave's sister
Valerie Deore – guest co–host, from Dallas' 105.3 Free FM
Danni – guest co–host, from 92.3 Free FM's The Booker Show
Uncle Manny Roth – studio guest, Dave's uncle
Ludlow Stan – recurring studio guest, record reviews
Elizabeth Hayt (N.Y. Post Columnist – Love & Hayt) – recurring studio guest
Animal – Dave's bodyguard
Matt Sencio – Dave's manager
Sasha – intern
Chop – car salesman
Stacy – the listener who called daily to scream to David on the air that he "sucked"

References

External links
The David Lee Roth Show Official website (Retrieved from the Internet Archives)
Rare audio of his show

American talk radio programs
2006 radio programme debuts
2006 disestablishments
Show
CBS Radio programs